The 2021 Delray Beach Open (officially known as 2021 Delray Beach Open by VITACOST.com for sponsorship reasons) was a professional men's tennis tournament played on hard courts. It was the 29th edition of the tournament, and part of the 2021 ATP Tour. It took place in Delray Beach, Florida, United States between January 7 and January 13, 2021. Due to the COVID-19 pandemic, it was rescheduled from its original dates in mid February. Fourth-seeded Hubert Hurkacz won the singles title.

Points and prize money

Point distribution

Prize money 

*per team

Singles main-draw entrants

Seeds

1 Rankings as of January 4, 2021.

Other entrants 
The following players received wildcards into the main draw:
  JC Aragone
  Ryan Harrison
  Noah Rubin

The following players received entry from the qualifying draw:
  Christian Harrison
  Kevin King
  Roberto Quiroz
  Donald Young

Withdrawals 
Before the tournament
  Federico Delbonis → replaced by  Sebastian Korda 
  Dan Evans → replaced by  Daniel Elahi Galán
  Dominik Koepfer → replaced by  Mackenzie McDonald 
  Kei Nishikori → replaced by  Bjorn Fratangelo
  Reilly Opelka → replaced by  Thomaz Bellucci
  Vasek Pospisil → replaced by  Nam Ji-sung
  Milos Raonic → replaced by  Tomás Martín Etcheverry
  Mikael Ymer → replaced by  Ivo Karlović

Doubles main-draw entrants

Seeds 

1 Rankings are as of January 4, 2021.

Other entrants 
The following pairs received wildcards into the main draw:
  Bjorn Fratangelo /  Dennis Novikov
  Ryan Harrison /  Christian Harrison

The following pair received entry into the main draw using a protected ranking:
  Mackenzie McDonald /  Tommy Paul

The following pair received entry into the main draw as alternates:
  Hunter Johnson /  Yates Johnson

Withdrawals 
Before the tournament
   Treat Huey /  Milos Raonic → replaced by  Nathaniel Lammons /  Jackson Withrow
  Hubert Hurkacz /  John Isner → replaced by  Hunter Johnson /  Yates Johnson
  Ken Skupski /  Neal Skupski → replaced by  Oliver Marach /  Luis David Martínez

Champions

Singles 

  Hubert Hurkacz def.  Sebastian Korda, 6–3, 6–3

Doubles 

  Ariel Behar /  Gonzalo Escobar def.  Christian Harrison /  Ryan Harrison, 6–7(5–7), 7–6(7–4), [10–4]

References

External links
Official website

Delray Beach Open
Delray Beach Open
Delray Beach Open
Delray Beach
Delray Beach Open